After 28 years without a postal code system in Namibia, the national postal service provider NamPost introduced new postal codes in December 2018.

They consist of five digits, where the first two indicate the region, the last two the post office and the third digit is always a 0.

Address format examples

Former South West Africa post codes 
Before independence in 1990, when the country was under South African administration, it formed part of that country's post code system, but following independence, use of post codes was discontinued.
South West Africa, including the enclave of Walvis Bay, was allocated the number range 9000–9299. 

 P.O. Box 287
 WINDHOEK 
 9100

 P.O. Box 44
 SWAKOPMUND
 9180 

 P.O. Box 779
 WALVIS BAY
 9190 

However, the code 9000 was commonly used for all addresses for mail from or via South Africa. 

 Private Bag 13267
 WINDHOEK 
 9000

 Private Bag 5017
 SWAKOPMUND
 9000 

 P.O. Box 953
 WALVIS BAY
 9000

Walvis Bay remained under South African administration until 1994.

References

Namibia
Post
Postal system of Namibia